is a Japanese actor, voice actor, and theater director. He has appeared in more than sixty films since 1965.

Career
Emori entered the acting school at the Bungakuza theater troupe in 1962 and came to fame with the play Ōmugiiri no chikin sūpu in 1964. Also appearing on television and in film, he began directing theater in 1981 with Hamlet.

Selected filmography

Television

Film

References

External links
 

1944 births
Living people
People from Tokyo
Japanese male voice actors
Japanese male film actors
Japanese male television actors